SS Gedania was an oil tanker built in 1919-1920 at Kiel, Germany for the Standard Oil of New Jersey's transatlantic shipments to Germany, and registered under the flag of the Free City of Danzig.  In 1940, the tanker was requisitioned by the Kriegsmarine and converted to a support ship for naval operations in the Atlantic.  On the first mission in July 1941, to support commerce raiding by the German battleship  and cruiser , Gedania was captured and taken into service with the British Ministry of War Transport as Empire Garden. In 1947 it returned to commercial service as Southern Garden with the South Georgia Company, transporting whale oil from the southern Atlantic, and carrying supplies and personnel to the whaling stations. The tanker was broken up in 1960.

Construction
The steam tanker Gedania was launched in September 1919 by Howaldtswerke at Kiel, as Yard No 587, and given a Latin name for Danzig. It was the first of a pair ordered before World War I by Deutsch-Amerikanische Petroleum Gesellschaft (DAPG, German-American Petroleum Company), the German subsidiary of Standard Oil of New Jersey (the other, Yard No 588 was completed in 1921 as Vistula).

Registry and civilian career
In 1919, before the two ships were completed, they were transferred to Baltisch-Amerikanische Petroleum Import Gesellschaft (BAPIG), a Standard Oil subsidiary in the Free City of Danzig, and registered there in order not to be included in the war reparations arrangements under the Treaty of Versailles of 1919 which caused DAPG to lose their German-flag ships.

During her service with BAPIG, the vessel was largely used to transport oil from the ports of Gulf Coast of the United States and Mexico to Germany. Wilhelm Anton Riedemann was one of Standard Oil's partners in DAPG, which in 1928 was renamed Waried Tankschiff Rhederei GmbH, of Hamburg; two years later that company became the ship manager of Gedania. In 1933 the tanker's ownership was transferred to the Waried company and registry changed from Danzig to Hamburg, under German flag.

In 1922 a Bauer-Wach low pressure exhaust turbine was additionally fitted, increasing the engine power from 404nhp to 462nhp and 3000ihp.

Requisition
When the Second World War started, Gedania was sailing from Aruba to Germany. To avoid capture, the ship was forced to seek refuge in the Port of Las Palmas in the Canary Islands. On 1 October 1940 Gedania was requisitioned by the Kriegsmarine and ordered to sail on 15 October 1940 to Saint-Nazaire to be outfitted, arriving on the 2 November 1940.

In Saint-Nazaire, the ship was converted into a supply oiler for the German battleship  and given the code name "Maikäfer" (cockchafer).

Crew
At the start of her military life, Gedania had a crew of 101 men of which 45 were Kriegsmarine sailors. The senior naval officer aboard was the ship's doctor.

Outfitting and supplies
The ship underwent extensive modification to expand the available space for supplies. The following structural changes were made:
 Store rooms were to built below the main deck, for'ard.
 A refrigerator was supplied and installed.
 In the rear, store rooms for prisoners were created. Initially rooms for 300 prisoners were requested by the naval architect, Wilhelm Meyer, but the decision was made to only provide space for 120 people. 
 An ammunition store was created in the forward cargo space.
 Two motorboats for use as escape craft were installed.
 Two 7.5 cm guns with large stereoscopic rangefinders along with four 2cm anti-aircraft guns were fitted to the after extended boat deck.
 An Anschütz gyrocompass was fitted on the bridge.

The following supplies were taken on in Saint-Nazaire in preparation for sailing:
 48 torpedoes with fitted warheads 
 48 torpedo pistols, detonators and primers
 200 gallons of lubricating oil and a similar amount of torpedo fuel.
 500 shells and 500 cordite charges for 15 cm guns. 	 
 1600 rounds of fixed 10.5cm ammunition  
 1000 rounds of fixed 7.5cm ammunition   
 2000 rounds of fixed 2.0cm ammunition  
 Large cargo of diesel and bunker oil
 A collection of engineers tools and two 8inch lathes
 A wireless transmitter (WT), a direction finder and two portable WT sets for use ashore.  
 A collection of canned provisions that included butter, sausages and fruit
 A collection of frozen meat and vegetables that included bacon and potatoes that had started to rot by the time the ship was captured.

Wartime operational cruise
The Gedania sailed from Saint-Nazaire on 0800 on the 25 May 1941 and arrived at La Pallice at 2130 on the same day. At the port of La Pallice, the Gedania waited for further orders. She then sailed west, following the coast of Spain, finally crossing the 44th parallel to the west of La Corunna. During the afternoon of 4 June 1941 at the position , the Gedania was intercepted by the ocean boarding vessel  and after a chase that lasted two hours, the ship was captured and the whole crew were taken prisoner. A landing party visited the ship to search for any cryptographic material that may not have been destroyed and to sail her to Scotland. The crew had left scuttling charges as they had left the ship as per instructions, but the damage to the ship was insufficient to sink her and she was soon sufficiently repaired to enable her to be get under steam.

Although the Gedania was a veteran of many cruises, her first military cruise was her last. The mission of the ship was initially thought to be as a supply ship for U-boats in the Southern Atlantic Ocean. However it was noticed that she held specific ammunition that could only be used by surface vessels as well as containing space for 120 prisoners, all indicative of a mission to supply surface craft. Certainly the initial mission of the ship seemed to be to sail into the Central Atlantic, then find and takeover the patrol of the supply tanker . The Gedania would have remained on position until all the torpedoes were transferred. Further orders were then to be issued by Western Command to both ships.

British-flag service
After capture, Gedania was taken to Greenock by the boarding crew, arriving on 12 June 1941. The tanker was renamed Empire Garden by the Ministry of War Transport (MoWT), registered in London (Official Number 168211) and placed under the management of Gow, Harrison & Co. Despite repairs in the UK of damage from the scuttling charges when converted to a naval tanker, it continued to require further attention during its MoWT service. The tanker was damaged by fire at Singapore in 1946, and only released by the Royal Navy in March 1947. The return voyage from Hong Kong to the UK via Abadan took six months, with stops for repairs in Singapore, Colombo and Karachi.

While en route to the UK, Empire Garden was purchased from MoWT by the South Georgia Company Ltd., a subsidiary of Christian Salvesen Ltd, for service as a supply ship for the company's southern ocean whaling operations, based in Leith Harbour, South Georgia Island. The ship was renamed Southern Garden and registered at Leith, Scotland. The accommodation added in 1940 intended for prisoners was upgraded to be used for transporting the crews of locally-based whale catchers and other employees. During the major refit the ship caught fire and when leaving Liverpool in May 1948 engine trouble developed requiring a return for repairs at Birkenhead, where another fire broke out. The ship had further engine trouble on her subsequent return from South Georgia and had to be assisted back before going to South Shields for extensive repairs. After returning from the 1959-1960 whaling season Southern Garden was laid up off Southend-on-Sea and sold in July 1960 to the British Iron & Steel Corporation (Salvage) Ltd. for demolition. Scrapping was carried out by Thomas W. Ward Ltd at Inverkeithing, Fife.

References

External links
 Mariners

1919 ships
Ships built in Kiel
Maritime incidents in June 1941
Steamships of Germany
Steamships of the United Kingdom
Tankers of the United Kingdom
World War II auxiliary ships of Germany
Captured ships
Empire ships
Ministry of War Transport ships